Péter Bíró (born 4 November 1997) is a Hungarian football player who plays for Tiszafüred.

Career

Debrecen
On 22 July 2017, Bíró played his first match for Debrecen in a 0-1 loss against Szombathelyi Haladás in the Hungarian League.

Career statistics

Club

References

External links

Profile at DVSC

1997 births
Living people
Sportspeople from Debrecen
Hungarian footballers
Association football forwards
Debreceni VSC players
Nemzeti Bajnokság I players
Nemzeti Bajnokság II players